Songs from the Grass String Ranch is the fifth studio album by the American country rock band the Kentucky Headhunters. It was released by Audium Entertainment in 2000. The album includes singles "Too Much to Lose", "Louisianna CoCo" and "Love That Woman." Although "Too Much to Lose" reached number 66 on the country charts, the other two singles failed to chart.

Critical reception
Country Standard Time wrote that "otherwise crisp tunes 'Country Life' and 'Jessico' suffer from a stilted rock sound that doesn't quite fit Kentucky's motley crew."

Track listing

Personnel
From Songs from the Grass String Ranch liner notes.

The Kentucky Headhunters
 Anthony Kenney - bass guitar, background vocals
 Greg Martin - lead guitar, rhythm guitar, 12-string guitar, acoustic guitar, mandolin, background vocals
 Doug Phelps - rhythm guitar, 12-string guitar, acoustic guitar, lead vocals (except "Dry-Land Fish" and "Louisianna CoCo"), background vocals
 Fred Young - drums, percussion; lead vocals on "Dry-Land Fish"
 Richard Young - rhythm guitar, background vocals; lead vocals on "Louisianna CoCo"

Additional musicians
 Joey Huffman - horns on "Grass String Ranch", strings on "I Wish I Knew"
 David Jessie - percussion on "Jessico"
 Kenny Weber - banjo on "Jessico"
 Reese Wynans - piano, Hammond B-3 organ

Technical
 David Barrick - recording
 Chris Fleming - engineering
 Mitchell Fox - executive production
 Robert Hammon - engineering
 The Kentucky Headhunters - production
 Rodney Mills - mixing, mastering
 John Nielsen - mixing

References

2000 albums
The Kentucky Headhunters albums
E1 Music albums